Gene Geimer is a former U.S. soccer forward who spent seven seasons in the North American Soccer League and at least one season in Major Indoor Soccer League.  Before entering the professional ranks, Geimer won a National Amateur Cup with St. Louis Kutis in 1971.  He also earned six caps, scoring two goals, with the United States in 1972 and 1973.

Youth and college
Geimer grew up in St. Louis and attended St. Louis University where he played both soccer and baseball.  He was a two-year letterman on the baseball team in 1969 and 1970, but gained his greatest fame on the soccer field.  He was a member of the Billikens' soccer team from 1967 to 1969, starting the last two years.   In 1967 and then again in 1969, the Billikins took the NCAA Men's Soccer Championship.  In 2004, St. Louis University inducted Geimer into the school’s Hall of Fame.

St. Louis Kutis
After leaving St. Louis University, Geimer played with St. Louis Kutis of the St. Louis Municipal Leagues.  In 1971, Kutis won the National Amateur Cup title.

NASL
In 1971, the St. Louis Stars of the North American Soccer League (NASL) drafted Geimer.  He played with the Stars for five seasons.  In 1972 the Stars went to the NASL championship only to fall to the New York Cosmos.  However, to get there, the Stars defeated the Rochester Lancers 2-0 in the semi-finals with one goal coming from Geimer.  Geimer’s most productive season came in 1973 when he finished fourth on the NASL scoring list with ten goals and five assists.  At the end of the 1975 season, the Stars traded Geimer to the Boston Minutemen.  He began the 1976 season with the Boston Minutemen, but was traded to the Chicago Sting after ten games.  He finished the 1976 season, then spent the 1977 season with the Sting.

MISL
In 1978,  Geimer joined the Cincinnati Kids for the first season of a new indoor soccer league, the Major Indoor Soccer League (MISL).  He set a regular-season record with seven goals in a game, a record later broken by Steve Zungul.

National team
Geimer earned his first cap with the U.S. national team in an August 20, 1972 loss to Canada.  He scored in his second game with the national team nine days later when the U.S. tied Canada 2-2 on goals from Geimer and Willy Roy.  Geimer played two more games that year, scoring again in a 2-1 loss to Mexico on September 10.  His last game with the national team came in an October 16, 1973 loss to Mexico.

References

External links
 NASL/MISL stats

1949 births
Living people
American soccer players
Boston Minutemen players
Chicago Sting (NASL) players
Cincinnati Kids players
Indianapolis Daredevils players
Major Indoor Soccer League (1978–1992) players
North American Soccer League (1968–1984) players
Soccer players from St. Louis
Saint Louis Billikens men's soccer players
St. Louis Stars (soccer) players
St. Louis Kutis players
United States men's international soccer players
Association football forwards